2nd Turkmenevo (2-se Törökmän) is a rural locality (a village) in Mukasovsky Selsoviet, Baymaksky District, Russia. The population was 156 as of 2010.

Geography 
2nd Turkmenevo is located 60 km northeast of Baymak (the district's administrative centre) by road. 1st Turkmenevo is the nearest rural locality.

Streets 
 Muradym
 Tuyalyas

References

External links 
 2nd Turkemenevo on komandirovka.ru
 Council of Municipalities of the Republic of Bashkortostan

Rural localities in Baymaksky District